Šárka Strachová (née Záhrobská ; born on 11 February 1985) is a retired Czech World Cup alpine ski racer. Born in Benecko, she specializes in the slalom event. Strachová is the first alpine racer representing the Czech Republic to medal at the Winter Olympics and at the World Championships and just the second Czech alpine skier ever to medal in the Olympics.

Ski racing career
Záhrobská won the gold medal in slalom at the 2007 World Championships and narrowly missed a bronze in the super combined, finishing in 4th place by 0.20 seconds. Two years earlier, she won her first medal at the 2005 World Championships, taking the bronze in slalom while placing fifth in the combined. It was the first World Championships medal for a Czech alpine skier. In the 2006 Winter Olympics, Strachová finished 13th in slalom, 19th in the combined, and 27th in super-G; she did not finish the second run of the giant slalom.

On the World Cup circuit, Záhrobská made her debut in December 2002 at age 17 and finished 5th in her first race, a parallel slalom (an experimental format using a series of elimination races) in Sestriere, Italy.  She ended the 2004 and 2006 seasons ranked in the top 10 in slalom, and broke into the top 30 in the overall ranking in 2006.  She reached her first World Cup podium in January 2007, with a third place in the slalom on at Zagreb, Croatia, and followed it up with a 2nd place in the slalom three days later at Kranjska Gora, Slovenia. This ended a 21-year-long drought for Czech alpine skiers on the World Cup podium, since Olga Charvátová took 2nd place in Bromont, Quebec, on 22 March 1986. She won her first World Cup race in November 2008 in Aspen, Colorado, and reached the podium two additional times in the 2009 season to finish as the runner-up in the season slalom standings.  She won again at Aspen in November 2009.

At the 2010 Winter Olympics in Vancouver, Strachová took the bronze medal in the slalom at Whistler. This made her the first Czech to ever medal in alpine skiing for the Czech Republic and just the second Czech ever, once again joining Olga Charvátová, who won a bronze in the 1984 Winter Olympics while competing for Czechoslovakia.

Strachová has also won numerous medals at the National Alpine Skiing Championships of the Czech Republic and other nations. She has been the National Champion (i.e. gold medalist) at the Czech (2002: slalom; 2003: slalom, giant slalom and super-G; 2004: slalom, giant slalom; 2005: slalom, giant slalom; 2006: super-G), Slovenian (2006: giant slalom), and Croatian (2006: giant slalom) national championships. Her giant slalom victory at the 2006 Croatian championships was by a narrow 0.15 second margin over Janica Kostelić, who had just beaten Strachová for the super-G title the previous day and was coming off one of the most dominant seasons in World Cup skiing history.

Šárka Strachová and her brother Petr Záhrobský are the only skiers of the Ski Team Krkonoš. Their personal coach is their father Petr Záhrobský. The team has not had good relationships with the Czech Ski Association. The coach protested, especially after the association officials approved the rule that Czech skiers have to prefer their home competitions to the foreign ones, and refused to follow it, stating that Strachová needs better rivals to remain a premier international skier. Šárka Strachová also does not prepare with the rest of the Czech national team because her father believes it would disadvantage her career.

Both Šárka Strachová and her brother Petr race on Fischer skis.

On 28 March 2017 Strachová announced her retirement from professional skiing aged 32.

Personal life 
In 2013, she married her long-time boyfriend, Antonín Strach and became Šárka Strachová. On 14 November 2017 Strachová announced her pregnancy.

World Cup results

Season standings

Race podiums
2 wins – (2 SL)
17 podiums – (17 SL)

World Championship results

Olympic results

References

External links
 
 

 
 

1985 births
Czech female alpine skiers
Alpine skiers at the 2006 Winter Olympics
Alpine skiers at the 2010 Winter Olympics
Alpine skiers at the 2014 Winter Olympics
Olympic alpine skiers of the Czech Republic
Medalists at the 2010 Winter Olympics
Olympic medalists in alpine skiing
Olympic bronze medalists for the Czech Republic
People from Semily District
Living people
Sportspeople from the Liberec Region